FC Honka Naiset is a Finnish women's football team representing FC Honka Espoo in the top-tier Kansallinen Liiga.

They were promoted to the top division for the first time in 2002, and won three successive titles in 2006, 2007 and 2008. In 2017 they again won the title.

Honours
 4 Finnish Leagues (2006, 2007, 2008, 2017)
 3 Finnish Cups (2009, 2014, 2015)

Current squad
As of 1 September 2020.

Former players

References

External links
Official website

Women's football clubs in Finland
Association football clubs established in 1975
Sport in Espoo